Darnum railway station was a railway station on the Orbost railway line. It was opened in 1880 and closed sometime in the mid-late 1900s . The station was provided with a saleyard in 1910. Milk was also loaded and shipped from the station to Flinders Street railway station every day.

References 

Disused railway stations in Victoria (Australia)
Railway stations in Australia opened in 1880
Transport in Gippsland (region)
Shire of Baw Baw